John Harington (1627–1700) was an English politician who sat in the House of Commons from 1654. He fought in the Parliamentary army in the English Civil War.

Harrington was the son of John Harrington of Kelston, Somerset and was baptised at Kelston on 19 May 1627. He matriculated at Lincoln College, Oxford on 21 February 1640, aged 13. In the Civil War he was a captain of a Somerset troop of horse in the Parliamentary army.  He was of Corston, and later of Kelston. His father died in 1654. In 1654, he was elected Member of Parliament for Somerset in the First Protectorate Parliament. He was re-elected MP for Somerset in 1656 for the Second Protectorate Parliament. In 1659 he was elected MP for Bath for the Third Protectorate Parliament.  
 
Harrington died at the age of 73 at Bath and was buried there on 16 April 1700.

References

1627 births
1700 deaths
Roundheads
Alumni of Lincoln College, Oxford
Politicians from Somerset
Burials in Somerset
English MPs 1654–1655
English MPs 1656–1658
English MPs 1659
John